1853 McElroy, provisional designation , is an asteroid from the outer region of the asteroid belt, approximately 21 kilometers in diameter. It was discovered on 15 December 1957, by the Indiana Asteroid Program at Goethe Link Observatory near Brooklyn, Indiana, United States, and named for American biochemist William D. McElroy.

Orbit and classification 

McElroy orbits the Sun in the outer main-belt at a distance of 2.9–3.2 AU once every 5 years and 4 months (1,958 days). Its orbit has an eccentricity of 0.05 and an inclination of 16° with respect to the ecliptic.

However the observation remained unused and the body's observation arc begins with its official discovery in 1957.

Physical characteristics 

McElroy is characterized as a generic X-type and carbonaceous C-type asteroid by the Lightcurve Data Base and by PanSTARRS photometric survey, respectively.

Rotation period 

Between 2004 and 2011, three rotational lightcurves of McElroy were obtained at Brian Warner's Palmer Divide Observatory and at the Palomar Transient Factory, respectively. Lightcurve analysis gave a rotation period between 8.016 and 8.026 hours with a brightness variation of 0.18–0.30 magnitude.

Diameter and albedo 

According to the surveys carried out by the Infrared Astronomical Satellite IRAS, the Japanese Akari satellite, and NASA's Wide-field Infrared Survey Explorer with its subsequent NEOWISE mission, McElroy measures between 17.47 and 24.07 kilometers in diameter, and its surface has an albedo of 0.197 to 0.304.

The Collaborative Asteroid Lightcurve Link derives an albedo of 0.194 and a diameter of 20.89 kilometers with an absolute magnitude of 10.8.

Naming 

This minor planet was named in honor of American biochemist William David McElroy (1917–1999), chairman of the biology department at Johns Hopkins University during the 1950s and 1960s, later director of the National Science Foundation (NSF) in the early 1970s and chancellor of the University of California at San Diego from until 1980.

During his tenure as director of NSF the U.S. government decided to fund the Very Large Array, now officially known as the Karl G. Jansky Very Large Array. The official naming citation was published by the Minor Planet Center on 1 August 1980.

References

External links 
 Lightcurve plot of 1853 McElroy, Palmer Divide Observatory, B. D. Warner (2004)
 Asteroid Lightcurve Database (LCDB), query form (info )
 Dictionary of Minor Planet Names, Google books
 Asteroids and comets rotation curves, CdR – Observatoire de Genève, Raoul Behrend
 Discovery Circumstances: Numbered Minor Planets (1)-(5000) – Minor Planet Center
 
 

 

001853
001853
Named minor planets
19571215